Nicol Hugh Baird (26 August 1796 – 18 October 1849) was a Scottish surveyor who worked for his uncle Charles Baird in St Petersburg for several years, and emigrated to Canada in 1828.

Works
Baird is known in Canada for the work on various canal and road construction in Upper and Lower Canada as well as inventing equipment for making existing locks more accessible for steamships. His skills as a surveyor and engineer are reflected as an integral part of projects such as the Rideau, Trent, and Welland canals. His thorough written accounts give historians a record of early Canadian engineering.

References

External links
 
 

1796 births
1849 deaths
Canadian surveyors
British canal engineers
Canadian civil engineers
People from Glasgow
Scottish civil engineers
Scottish emigrants to Canada
Scottish surveyors